Sekolah Menegah Kebangsaan Tun Tuah (SMKTT) is a secondary school located in Kampung Lapan, Bachang, Melaka , Malaysia.

History 

SMK Tun Tuah was established as an all-boys school in 1962. The school moved locations several times until it settled in its current location in Kampung Lapan, Bachang, Melaka in 1969, where it was subsequently renamed to Sekolah Menengah Bachang. On 3 November 1973, the school was officially recognised and was launched by the then Chief Minister of Melaka, Dato' Setia Abdul Ghani Ali. It was subsequently renamed to Sekolah Menengah Kebangsaan Tun Tuah, after the legendary Melaka warrior, Hang Tuah.

School Song 
Malay Edition
Sekolah Menengah Tun Tuah   
Di Melaka Bersejarah      
Pelbagai kaum bergaul mesra    
Bersatu berbudi bahasa 

Rukun Negara jadi pegangan
Tekun Usaha jadi amalan
Pelbagai ilmu jadi idaman
Buku dan sukan jadi gemaran

Kami mohon Tuhan Maha Kuasa
Tunjuk jalan benar lagi mulia
Nilai budaya disanjung sentiasa
Selalu hidup aman bahagia

Tun Tuah mengasah bakat kami
Hingga tercapai segala cita
Dengan taat, berazam dan berbudi
Kami mara hingga berjaya

English Edition
Sekolah Menengah Tun Tuah
In historical Malacca
Various races mingle harmoniously
In unity and courtesy

We abide by the Rukun Negara
We're diligent and hardworking
Pursuing knowledge is our desire
Books and sports are what we admire

We pray to God the Almighty
To lead us in the path of righteousness
Cultural values upheld all the time
Always thriving in joy and peace

Tun Tuah develops our talents
Till our aspirations realised
With loyalty, passion and courtesy
We shall advance towards victory

References 

Schools in Malacca
Secondary schools in Malaysia